Kostyantyn or Kostiantyn is a given name. Notable people with the name include:

Kostyantyn Balabanov (born 1982), Ukrainian football player
Kostyantyn Bocharov (born 1997), Ukrainian singer and songwriter
Kostyantyn Dankevych (1905–1984), Ukrainian composer and musical teacher
Kostyantyn Doroshenko (born 1972), Ukraine Art critic, contemporary art curator, media manager, radio host of talk radio station Radio Vesti (Ukraine)
Kostyantyn Dudchenko (born 1986), Ukrainian professional football player
Kostyantyn Dymarchuk (born 1977), former Ukrainian football player
Kostyantyn Gryshchenko (born 1953), Ukrainian diplomat and politician
Kostyantyn Kravchenko (born 1986), Ukrainian footballer
Kostyantyn Makhnovskyi (born 1989), Ukrainian professional football goalkeeper
Kostyantyn Milyayev (born 1987), Ukrainian platform diver
Kostyantyn Morozov, Minister of Defense of Ukraine, Extraordinary and Plenipotentiary Ambassador of Ukraine (2005)
Kostyantyn Odolskyi (born 1989), professional Ukrainian football goalkeeper
Kostyantyn Ostrozkyi (1460–1530), magnate of the Grand Duchy of Lithuania and later a Grand Hetman of Lithuania
Kostyantyn Panin (born 1975), Ukrainian midfielder who has recently played for FC Zhetysu in Kazakhstan
Kostyantyn Parkhomenko (born 1991), Ukrainian football player who last played for FC Sakhalin Yuzhno-Sakhalinsk
Kostyantyn Pavliuchenko (born 1971), retired Kazakhstani professional footballer who also holds Ukrainian citizenship
Kostyantyn Piliyev (born 1983), Ukrainian weightlifter
Kostyantyn Rurak (born 1974), retired sprinter from Ukraine, who twice competed at the Summer Olympics: 1996 and 2000
Kostyantyn Shchehodskyi (1911–1989), Soviet-Ukrainian football player and coach from Moscow
Kostyantyn Simchuk (born 1974), former Ukrainian professional ice hockey goaltender
Kostyantyn Symashko, Ukrainian Paralympic footballer who won a gold medal at the 2008 Summer Paralympics in China
Kostyantyn Vasyukov (born 1981), retired Ukrainian athlete specialising in the sprinting events
Kostyantyn Vizyonok (born 1976), former Ukrainian football player
Kostyantyn Yaroshenko (born 1986), professional Ukrainian football defender for FC Ural Sverdlovsk Oblast in the Russian Premier
Kostyantyn Zaytsev (born 1983), Ukrainian Olympic rower
Kostyantyn Zhevago (born 1974), Ukrainian entrepreneur, the youngest self-made billionaire in Europe

See also
Konstantin
Konstanty (disambiguation)
Constantine (name)

Ukrainian masculine given names